Bolanle Olukanni is a Nigerian TV presenter  popularly known for hosting Moments with Mo on DStv and Project Fame West Africa.

Early life 
Bolanle was raised in Nigeria, Israel, America and Kenya.  Olukanni attended St. Saviour's Primary School in Lagos and went on to Queens College for secondary school. Olukanni moved to Kenya where she attended  Rosslyn Academy  in Nairobi, Kenya for part of her high school. Before her final year of high school, she moved to America  and for her senior year she attended Wichita Southeast High School in Wichita, Kansas, where she participated in the National Speech and Debate Tournament for Dramatic Interpretation.

In 2007, Olukanni received a Bachelor's degree from Loyola University, Chicago, with a double degree –  Bachelors of Arts in both Communications and International Studies. She has hosted "Moments with Mo" on DStv and Project Fame West Africa.

She got her first TV job as a co-host of a TV series called "Moments with Mo".

Bolanle co-founded Sage & Walls, a multimedia production company in 2015; she is producer and host of “On the Carpet with Bolinto”. She is a partner of an NGO called  The Self-Worth organization.  She is the Founder of God's Wives Foundation.

In 2019 she wrote, directed and produced her first documentary titled “Gods Wives” and she became the host of "The Juice" on NdaniTV".

Awards and nominations

References

External links

Year of birth missing (living people)
Living people
Nigerian television presenters
Nigerian women television presenters
Loyola University Chicago alumni
Wichita Southeast High School alumni
Nigerian television personalities
Nigerian media personalities